Febo di Poggio was an Italian model, affiliated with the Renaissance artist Michelangelo.

References in Michelangelo's poetry
In Michelangelo's poetry G.99, he alludes to Febo as Phoebus and further puns on his surname "del Poggio" which means "of the hill." This is clearly seen in the first stanza:

Furthermore, Michelangelo shows his grief with Febo when he states in the second stanza:

The allusion of the bird is further re-iterated in the third stanza or the start of sextet:

Michelangelo was so affected by Febo that he ends the poem with references to classical death:

In the poem G.100, Michelangelo alludes to Poggio as Apollo when he states:

References

Italian male models
Italian artists' models
Italian Roman Catholics
Michelangelo
Year of birth missing
16th-century deaths